Syesha Raquel Mercado (born January 2, 1987) is an American singer-songwriter, actress, and model. Mercado was the third-place finalist on the seventh season of American Idol. Prior to Idol, Mercado was on The One: Making a Music Star and she won Florida Super Singer. Her musical influences are Whitney Houston, Etta James, Alicia Keys, Zap Mama, Lauryn Hill, and Aretha Franklin.

On June 25, 2009,  Mercado was officially confirmed to have landed the lead role of Deena Jones in the United States national tour of Dreamgirls that also opened internationally in Japan. The tour began at the Apollo Theater on November 7, 2009.

Biography

Early life
Mercado was born in Bridgeport, Connecticut, on January 2, 1987. Her mother, Zelda, a former Motown backup singer, is African American and her father, José, is of Puerto Rican descent.  Mercado grew up in Bradenton and Sarasota, Florida. She attended Booker High School for the Visual and Performings Arts Theatre Program and graduated with a certificate as a performance major in Sarasota, where she appeared in various productions. At the 2005 Florida Theatre Conference and the 2005 South Eastern Theatre Conference, Mercado won "Best Supporting Actress" for her role as the Sour Kangaroo in Seussical the Musical.
Mercado also appeared as a contestant on the failed ABC talent show, The One: Making a Music Star in summer 2006.

Education
Mercado attended Daughtrey Elementary School and Manatee School for the Arts both in Manatee County. Dreaming to become a gospel singer one day, Mercado signed a contract at age nine with the Take Stock in Children, a scholarship program for "low-income families who show potential for college, but are unlikely to be able to afford a higher education." Mercado graduated from Booker High School in 2005, where she was in the Theater Visual and Performing Arts department. She also attended Florida International University in Miami, majoring in theatre.

Personal life
Mercado is best friends with former idol contestant Ramiele Malubay.

The One: Making a Music Star

Performances/results

:  The show was cancelled after Top 10 week.

Florida Super Singer

Performances/results

:  Based on 3 Judges, text message and internet votes. 2,000,000 in total

American Idol

Overview

She auditioned for American Idol Season 7 in Miami, Florida, singing "Think" by Aretha Franklin where she made it to Hollywood with all three judges saying 'yes'. When she arrived in Hollywood she had lost her voice and insisted on going on vocal rest. She was seen communicating through paper and pen to the camera throughout the week.  She sang "Chain of Fools" and was accepted into the top 24.  She was the only female in the top 3 and was voted off on May 14 allowing fellow contestants David Archuleta and David Cook a chance to compete in the finale and joining Kimberley Locke and Jax as the female contestants to get voted off in the top 3 to allow two male contestants to compete in the finale.

Despite good reviews from the judges, Mercado had been in the bottom three or two five times without being voted off. This led to her tying up with season one fellow 3rd place finalist, Nikki McKibbin, for the most weeks spent in the bottom three or two at the time until season fourteen 4th place finalist, Rayvon Owen, was featured in that same position six different times. Some commentators, including American Idol judge Simon Cowell, believed her style was more suited for Broadway than pop music.

Performances/results

:  Mercado was saved first from elimination.
:  When Ryan Seacrest announced the results for this particular night, Mercado was among the Bottom 3 but declared safe second when Chikezie was eliminated.
:  When revealing the results, Seacrest simultaneously declared Mercado and Carly Smithson safe, as Michael Johns was eliminated.
:  When Ryan Seacrest announced the results for this particular night, Mercado was among the Bottom 2 but declared safe when Carly Smithson was eliminated.

Post-Idol career

After her elimination, Mercado appeared on Live with Regis and Kelly, The Morning Show with Mike and Juliet and WSVN's Deco Drive.

Also, the week following the grand finale, Syesha sold a total of 18,000 legal downloads from iTunes.

She completed the American Idols LIVE! Tour 2008 which ran from July 1, 2008, to September 13, 2008.  The songs she performed on the tour were "Umbrella" by Rihanna, "If I Ain't Got You" by Alicia Keys and "Listen" by Beyoncé.

In November 2008, she performed "One Rock and Roll Too Many" in the 6abc IKEA Thanksgiving Day Parade. She was the guest host of the WSVN 7 yacht at the 37th annual Seminole Hard Rock Winterfest Boat parade on December 13, 2008. She sang "The Star-Spangled Banner" at the Miami Dolphins and the San Francisco 49ers game on Fox on December 14, 2008. On December 20, 2008, she assisted the Habitat for Humanity in building homes for struggling families in Miramar, Florida.

In February 2009, she participated in the opening of the American Idol Experience attraction at Disney's Hollywood Studios. On February 19, 2009, Mercado performed in her first live concert after the American Idols LIVE! Tour 2008.  It was her own concert where all the proceeds went to benefit the Amer-I-Can program, a gang-prevention program started by NFL great, Jim Brown. She performed eight songs in front of a sold out audience of about 4,000 fans.

She sang "The Star-Spangled Banner" for the opening day baseball game between the Oakland Athletics and the Los Angeles Angels of Anaheim on April 6, 2009.

She most recently worked on an album in Los Angeles. She has stated that it is to be a pop/R&B album. In addition to working on the album, in her free time she is taking acting lessons.

Mercado acted in her first feature film Dreams in 2011 as the character Mia. She released a cover of "Love on Top" by Beyoncé that went viral online, inching two million views on YouTube. Mercado is also known for her acoustic, soulful cover of "Skyfall" by Adele.

Theatre
It was officially confirmed on June 25, 2009, that Mercado landed the lead role of Deena Jones in the upcoming United States national tour of Dreamgirls. On November 4, 2009, Mercado appeared on The Wendy Williams Show to promote the tour which began on November 7, 2009, and ended on December 29, 2010.

Mercado then starred as Ti Moune in the revival of Once on This Island at the Paper Mill Playhouse in Millburn, New Jersey. Opening night was May 30, 2012, on a run through June 24.

Mercado performed in the Chicago transfer production of Broadway musical Book of Mormon. She was a late addition to the cast, replacing Stephanie Umoh during rehearsals in the role of Nabulungi.

From January to June 2014, Mercado reprised the role of Nabulungi in the Broadway production of the Book of Mormon, making it her Broadway debut.

Discography
Singles
 "Christmas Melody" (2011)
 "Tears" (2017)

References

External links

 

1987 births
Living people
Musicians from Bridgeport, Connecticut
20th-century African-American women singers
American Idol participants
American musical theatre actresses
American people of Puerto Rican descent
American women singer-songwriters
American sopranos
21st-century American singers
Singer-songwriters from Florida
Florida International University people
Actresses from Miami
Actresses from Bridgeport, Connecticut
Singer-songwriters from New York (state)
21st-century American women singers
African-American songwriters
21st-century African-American women singers
Singer-songwriters from Connecticut